The amphibians of Nepal represent a variety of species, including:

Anura (frogs and toads)

True frogs

Order: AnuraFamily: Ranidae

 Assam sucker frog (Amolops formosus)
 Himalaya sucker frog (Amolops himalanus)
 Yembung sucker frog (Amolops gerbillus)
 Marbled sucker frog (Amolops marmoratus)
 Mountain sucker frog (Amolops monticola)
 Humerana humeralis
 Black striped frog (Sylvirana nigrovittata)

True toads

Order: AnuraFamily: Bufonidae

 Marbled toad (Duttaphrynus stomaticus)
 Asian common toad (Duttaphrynus melanostictus)

Fork-tongued frogs 

Order: AnuraFamily: Dicroglossidae

 Indian skitter frog (Euphlyctis cyanphlyctis)
 Jerdon's bullfrog (Hoplobatrachus crassus)
 Asian bullfrog ( Hoplobatrachus tigerinus)
 Northern frog (Ingerana borealis)
 Annandale's paa frog (Nanorana annandalii)
 Arnold's paa frog  (Nanorana arnoldi)
 Blandford's paa frog (Nanorana blanfordii)
 Torrent paa frog (Nanorana ercepeae)
 Sikkim paa frog (Nanorana liebigii)
 Nepal paa frog (Nanorana minica)
 Mountain slow frog (Nanorana parkeri)
  Langtana paa frog (Nanorana polunini)
  Rara paa frog (Narorana rarica)
 Dubois' paa frog (Nanorana rostandi) 
 Ombrana sikimensis
 Indian burrowing frog (Sphaerotheca breviceps)
 Sphaerotheca swani
 Sphaerotheca maskeyi
 Nepal cricket frog (Zakerana nepalensis)
 Pierre's cricket frog (Zakerana syhadrensis)
 Long legged cricket frog (Zakarena syhadrensis)
 Terai cricket frog (Zakerana teraiensis)

Narrow-mouthed frogs 

Order: AnuraFamily: Microhylidae

 Indian painted bullfrog (Uperodon taprobanicus)
 Ornamented pygmy frog (Microhyla ornata)

Shrub frogs 

Order: AnuraFamily: Rhacophoridae

 Common tree frog (Polypedates leucomystax)
 Annandale's bush frog (Raorchestes annandalii) 
 Nepal flying frog (Zhangixalus smaragdinus)

Goose frogs 

Order: AnuraFamily: Megophryidae

 Himalayan stream frog (Scutiger boulengeri)
 Nepal lazy toad (Scutiger nepalensis)
 Scutiger nyingchiensis
 Sikkim lazy toad (Scutiger sikimmensis)
 Small spadefoot toad (Megophrys parva)
 Bengal spadefoot toad (Megophrys robusta)

Gymnophiona (caecilians and relatives)

Family: Ichthyophiidae

 Darjeeling caecilians (Ichthyophis sikkimensis)

Urodela (salamanders and relatives)

Family: Salamandridae

 Himalayan newt (Tylototriton verrucosus)

References

Nepal
Nepal
Lists of biota of Nepal